Igder-e Sofla (also Romanized as Īgder-e Soflá; also known as Īgder-e Pā’īn and Īgūr-e Pā’īn) is a village in Fajr Rural District, in the Central District of Gonbad-e Qabus County, Golestan Province, Iran. At the 2006 census, its population was 2,318, in 487 families.

References 

Populated places in Gonbad-e Kavus County